Someshwara is a village in Karkala taluk in the Indian state of Karnataka.

Geography
Someshwara, in Karnataka, is a village in Hebri  taluk, at the foothills of Agumbe ghat section and about 11  km from Hebri town.  Name can be traced by the somanath temple in the town. There is also a Maha Ganapathi temple right opposite to the bus stand in the town.
It is a main junction for Mangalore, Udupi, Hebri, Kundapur and Shimoga.

Demographics

References

Cities and towns in Udupi district